is a compilation album by Japanese singer Yōko Oginome. Released through Victor Entertainment on June 28, 1995, the two-disc album compiles Oginome's singles from 1985 to 1994, plus deep cuts and B-sides from her past releases.

Track listing

References

External links
 
 

1995 compilation albums
Yōko Oginome compilation albums
Japanese-language compilation albums
Victor Entertainment compilation albums